Musa Ali (also Romanized as Mūsá ‘Alī) is a village in Rudkhaneh Bar Rural District, Rudkhaneh District, Rudan County, Hormozgan Province, Iran. At the 2006 census, its population was 82, in 20 families.

References 

Populated places in Rudan County